March for Our Lives Action Fund, commonly known as March for Our Lives, is a non-profit 501(c)(4) organization in the United States that engages in lobbying, political action, and advocacy efforts to encourage gun control legislation and fund demonstrations such as March for Our Lives in 2018. It is associated with the non-profit 501(c)(3) March for Our Lives Foundation, a non-partisan organization focused on education and voter registration.

History 
The March For Our Lives Action Fund was registered on March 8, 2018.

Deena Katz, a producer of Dancing With the Stars, was the founding president.

George Clooney and Oprah Winfrey both donated $500,000. 

The founding board was all adults, due to legal restrictions.

On February 10, 2021, March For Our Lives announced that David Hogg would take a leave of absence "to take some time for himself to reflect and recommit to the mission."

References 

Gun control advocacy groups in the United States
Left-wing advocacy groups in the United States
Gun politics in the United States
501(c)(4) nonprofit organizations

Organizations established in 2018